Innanje is a gram panchayat village in Kaup taluk, in the Udupi district of Karnataka state, India. The road from Kaup (NH-66) goes to Innanje.

Innanje is 14.2 km from its district headquarters Udupi, 3.5 km from its taluk headquarters Kaup, 50 km from Mangaluru and 398 km from the state capital Bangalore.

Innanje had a population of 3205 consisting of 1433 males and 1772 females in the 2011 census.

Nearby villages (with distances) are Kurkalu (3 km), Kote (4 km), Mallaru (7 km), Belle (7 km), Manipura (7 km), Shirva (7 km) and Bada (7 km).

Innanje has five residential areas or sub villages: Undaru, Madumbu, Kalyalu, Mandedi, and Pangal.

Places of Attraction:
Undaru Sri Vishnumoorthi Temple.
Brahmalingeshwara Temple, Bermottu, Madumbu.
Sri Dhoomavathi temple Kayalu. Maha Ganapathi temple Kalyalu,
Dhanush Theertha (Renjala Rock), Ajilakadu, Madumbu.

Agriculture: paddy and coconut.

Innanje and Shankerpura are known for their jasmine flower cultivation.

Roads: N.H-66 passes the village in Pangala.

Railway Station: Innanje.

River: Pangala, also known as Markody River.

Religion and ethnic groups:

The majority of people belong to Hindu religion, Catholic Christians are found in Shankarpura. Among Hindus, Billava, Bunta, Vishwakarma, Devadiga, Brahmin, Adi Karnataka/dravida communities are prominent. Koraga Tribal people are also lives here.

Language: Tulu/Kannada/Konkani.
Tulu communities especially speak Tulu as their mother tongue. Catholics use Konkani as their dialect, Kannada is a common language for day to day transactions. Hindi and English are understood and spoken.

Bootharadhane and Naagardhane are the common practice among the Tulu communities.

Schools and Colleges:
S.V.H Pre Primary, Primary, High School and P.U. College, affiliated to Sodhe Sri Vadiraja Mutt Udupi.

Shri Madhva Vadiraja Institute of Technology, Arasikatte, Shankarpura-Bantakal Road.

Innanje's pin code is 576122, and the post office's name is Innanje Post.

References

Villages in Udupi district